The Thak man-eater was a female Bengal tiger who killed and ate four human victims (two women, two men) between September and November 1938. She was operating in Kumaon, at the Nepalese border, between the villages Thak, Chuka, Kot Kindri and Sem. The tigress was shot at about 6:00pm on 30 November 1938 by Jim Corbett. This was the last man-eater killed by Corbett. The story about Thak man-eater is known as one of the most dramatic stories about man-eating animals. It was the last story in the USA edition of the bestselling book  Man-Eaters of Kumaon (published by Oxford University press in 1944). In the UK edition the last story of the book was "Just Tigers".  The book Man-Eaters of Kumaon became the book of the year in USA in 1945, and a Hollywood film Man-Eater of Kumaon was made in 1948.

Sources

The information about the female tiger, known as Thak man-eater, comes from two documented stories written by hunter, conservationist and author Jim Corbett. In a story about the Chuka man-eating tiger (from the book "Temple Tiger and other Man-Eaters of Kumaon", published in 1954 by Oxford University Press) Corbett described how he saw for the first time a female tiger which later became known as "The Thak man-eater". According to the story, in April 1938 Corbett was concealed on a machan waiting for the Chuka man-eating tiger, but instead of a male man-eater a female tiger with two young cubs appeared. Corbett described in detail how the tigress was teaching cubs to move silently through the jungles, leading them towards the concealed kill (a carcass of a cow), and on a final stage of the search letting cubs to find the kill themselves, coordinating their search with occasional vocal signals. After cubs found the kill, she went to sleep close to the tree where Corbett was concealed. After the cubs finished feeding, she licked both of them clean and then the family left. Corbett’s description is one of the first detailed accounts of how female tigers teach their cubs behavioral patterns necessary for  the survival of the tigers in the wild. 
 
The second source about the tigress is a story "Thak man-eater" from the bestselling book "Man-Eaters of Kumaon" (published in 1944 by Oxford University Press). According to Corbett, between April and September the tigress was apparently shot and wounded twice from a muzzle-loaded gun. One of the wounds to the left shoulder of the tigress became septic, incapacitating her at least for some time to hunt her usual prey. That was, according to Corbett, the reason the tigress started attacking humans, particularly as she had cubs to feed. Female tigers are known sometimes to resort to man-eating when they are partly incapacitated while raising cubs.
 
Corbett was asked to track down and kill the man-eater after the very first human kill. It was unusual for India to react so promptly to the killing of a first human victim by an animal. The reason for this was that next to the remote villages of Chuka and Thak, where the man-eater was operating, the government decided to fell trees and thousands of workers were planned to work in the area from November 1938. Governmental officials wanted to get rid of the man-eater in order not to hamper forest works. As Corbett noted in the story, he agreed to go after the tigress primarily because he wanted to help villagers to get rid of her.
 
Corbett made two hunting expeditions to the villages of Chuka, Thak and Sem (23 October – 7 November, and 24–30 November). He finally managed to kill the tigress on 30 November 1938, on the very last day of his second hunting expedition, and the last day of his career as a hunter of man-eating tigers and leopards.

The story

The story "Thak man-eater" was written by Corbett as a fully documental account of his hunt after the tigress. For the moment of writing and publishing the book Man-Eaters of Kumaon (1944), this story was the most recent hunt for Corbett, and unlike many other stories, where even the date of killing of the man-eater is not specified, this story has unprecedented number of exact dates and details.

From the first day of hunting her Corbett realized that the tigress was hunting him and his men. Corbett was finding her pug-marks following him wherever he went, so he had to be extremely careful not to become a victim. Two wounds, received by the tigress earlier at the kill, made her very cautious and she was not coming back to her kills. This made hunting her particularly difficult, as the most popular way to kill a tiger is to ambush it coming back to its kill. The village Thak was abandoned because of the fear of the man-eater, and the doors of many houses were left open. Tiger pug-marks were throughout the village streets and open doors, so Corbett had to be very careful not to give a chance to the tigress to attack him. Pug-marks were also often found near the tents where Corbett and his men were sleeping during his first hunting expedition, at the confluence of the Ladhya and Sarda rivers, near the village Sem. 
 
Apart from villagers, the tigress terrorized a five-thousand-strong work-force who were working in a nearby Kumaya-Chak, where thousands of trees were being felled. On one occasion the tigress came close to a building where workers were stationed, and workers started shouting at her to drive her away. Instead, very unnaturally for tigers, who usually avoid groups of shouting humans, this shouting infuriated the tigress and she came closer and with her roaring cowed thousands of workers into silence. 
 
According to Corbett, one of the cubs of the tigress, which Corbett saw together with his mother in April, was still around in October–November (the other one must have died). Corbett saw on many occasions the pug-marks of a young male tiger in October and November. November is a mating season for tigers, so the tigress’ calls were often heard. Corbett failed to kill the tigress during all three weeks of hunting. On the last evening of his hunt, 30 November, Corbett conceded defeat. After collecting his men and his two goats and walking to his camp with the decision to leave early morning next day, Corbett heard the tigress calling for a mate again. Corbett decided to try to deceive the tigress by himself calling as though a male tiger, as a last chance to get a shot at her. The tigress responded to Corbett's call and during the next 30 minutes she gradually approached Corbett and his men. They were on a path between the villages Thak and Chuka when he heard the first calls of the tigress, so finding a place to meet the man-eater became crucial for him. He decided on a four-foot-high rock on a piece of flat land about 800 meters from the village of Thak, on the path from Thak to Chuka. Sitting sideways on a narrow ledge at the back of the rock, Corbett rested his rifle on the top of the rock. The light was fading, and as Corbett did not have a lamp or flashlight, he was afraid that the tigress would appear too late and he would be unable to see her in the dark. This would have left Corbett and his men at a mercy of a man-eating tigress, enraged by her failed attempt to find a mate.
 
Fortunately for Corbett, the tigress appeared in front of him in the fading light, and he killed her with two bullets at close range. The recoil of the shots knocked Corbett from the ledge where he was sitting, and he fell on top of his four men and two goats, who were sitting silently behind the rock, terrorized by the roar of the approaching tigress.

This was the last man-eating tiger killed by Corbett, ending his 32 years career of hunting man-eating tigers and leopards. Corbett was 63 at the time. After just days of this hunt Corbett started a major project of filming the tigers in their natural environment with a newly available at that time "cinema-camera". Also, two years before this hunt, in 1936, with a major contribution from Jim Corbett, the first National Park in India, designed to save a tiger population (today this park is known as Corbett National Park) was established.

The killing site of the Thak man-eating tigress

The rock, where Corbett met and killed the Thak man-eater, became a source of much research, speculations and controversy. Peter Byrne, professional hunter and author, who investigated most of the Corbett hunting sites, showed in his book a few pictures of a big rock with a ledge as a site of killing of the Thak man-eater. Thak villagers showed this rock to Byrne in 1975  This rock does not coincide with several important details of Corbett’s description, and as a result, Peter Byrne's account of Corbett's hunt differs from Corbett's own account in many details (for example, according to Byrne, Corbett was standing behind the rock, not sitting on the ledge, and also, according to Byrne, Corbett did not fall after shooting, as there is no space for falling behind the rock). In the recent years Chuka villagers were showing Corbett fans another rock, closer to the village Thak, as the killing site of the Thak man-eater. This rock was found by a Corbett expert Sid Annand, and also has many discrepancies with Corbett’s description. As Corbett was widely known for his legendary honesty, and as his hunting accounts are regarded fully documental, disappearance of this famous rock, described in Corbett's story, was confusing. On 20–22 January 2011 Joseph Jordania did a detailed research of the path between Thak and Chuka. Following the description given by Corbett, he found a rock that did coincide with Corbett's description in most important details. He proposed that the path from Thak to Chuka have changed since 1938, and the killing site of the Thak man-eater is today about 25 meters away from the currently existing path (and about 40 meters south-east from the Peter Byrne's rock). On 9–12 April 2012 an international group of Corbett fans restored the falling space behind the rock, and affixed a memorial plate to the rock's western face. Unfortunately this particular rock proved to be at the wrong place (too close to village). Another Corbett researcher, Quinton Ottley followed Corbett's description and found the place that, he thought, corresponded precisely to Corbett words.  Quinton measured the area carefully and used all available satellite coordinates, and a new plaque was placed to mark the spot. Unfortunately, this rock was found to have several elements that does not correspond to Corbett's description (the height of the rock, the unstable position of Corbett behind the rock, leading to his fall, and the falling space itself). 

New field research to the Thak village was carried out by several Corbett researchers in April 2018. Researchers failed to come to a final conclusion, as both rocks have details that do not coincide with Corbett's words. According to a preliminary conclusion, Quinton Ottley's rock (found originally by Joel Lyall) is at the right distance from the Thak village, but the rock itself does not correspond to the description in the story. On the other hand, the rock found by Joseph Jordania corresponds precisely to the details of how Corbett positioned himself awkwardly behind the rock, and how he fell on top of his men after firing the two bullets that killed the Thak man-eater, but isn't the correct distance from the Thak village. Research is still ongoing.

References

External links
Jim Corbett Foundation

Man-eaters of India
Thak Tiger
Thak Tiger
Deaths due to tiger attacks
1938 animal deaths
1938 in India
Individual wild animals